Guerilla from the North is a 1983 Mexican drama film directed by Francisco Guerrero. It was entered into the 13th Moscow International Film Festival.

Cast
 Juan Valentín
 Ernesto Gómez Cruz
 Jorge Humberto Robles
 Macaria
 José Carlos Ruiz
 Silvia Manríquez
 Alfredo Wally Barrón
 Isabela Corona
 Alfonso Munguía
 Jorge Reynoso
 Alfredo Gutiérrez

References

External links
 

1983 films
1983 drama films
Mexican drama films
1980s Spanish-language films
1980s Mexican films